Tess Johnson (born June 19, 2000) is an American freestyle moguls skier. In 2014, she became the youngest moguls skier ever named to the United States national team. She has been named to the United States Olympic Team for the 2018 Winter Olympics in Pyeongchang.

Early life and education
Tess Johnson was born in Vail, Colorado to TJ and Carol Johnson. She is the granddaughter of William Oscar Johnson, a writer who covered the Olympics and ski racing for Sports Illustrated. Tess began skiing with her parents at age two. She played soccer for Vail Mountain School, which won state championships in 2015 and 2016.

Career
At fourteen years old, Johnson became the youngest ever moguls skier named to the United States nation team. In the 2014–15 season, she placed had five top-10 finishes on the NorAm tour. In 2016, she won the Grand Prix title for the NorAm tour. and a silver medal at the FIS Junior World Ski Championships.

In January 2018, Johnson placed fourth at a World Cup event in Tremblant, Quebec. The result was the best of any American competing at the event and Johnson's best World Cup finish to date. On January 22, 2018, Johnson was named to the United States Olympic Team for the 2018 Winter Olympics in Pyeongchang. At the Olympics, Johnson placed seventeenth in the first round of qualifying. She is coached by former Nordic skier Sylvan Ellefson as well as Riley Campbell and John Dowling.

References

External links

2000 births
People from Vail, Colorado
American female freestyle skiers
Living people
Freestyle skiers at the 2018 Winter Olympics
Olympic freestyle skiers of the United States
21st-century American women